Minnesota's 7th congressional district covers the majority of western Minnesota. It is by far the state's largest district, and has a very rural character. Except for a few southern counties in the 1st district, the 7th includes almost all of Western Minnesota. Cities in the district include Moorhead (its largest city), Fergus Falls, Alexandria and Willmar.

The 7th is the most Republican district in Minnesota, and is currently represented by Republican Michelle Fischbach. Despite this, the district was represented by DFL member Collin Peterson for 30 years (from 1991 to 2021), who was considered one of the most conservative Democrats in the House.

Demographics 
According to the APM Research Lab's Voter Profile Tools (featuring the U.S. Census Bureau's 2019 American Community Survey), the district contained about 501,000 potential voters (citizens, age 18+). Of these, 91% are White and 9% are people of color. Immigrants make up 2% of the district's potential voters. Median income among households (with one or more potential voter) in the district is about $61,000, while 9% of households live below the poverty line. As for the educational attainment of potential voters in the district, 8% of those 25 and older have not earned a high school degree, while 22% hold a bachelor's or higher degree.

List of members representing the district

Recent elections

2002

2004

2006

2008

2010

2012

2014

2016

2018

2020

2022

Election results from presidential races
Election results from presidential races:

Historical district boundaries

See also

Minnesota's congressional districts
List of United States congressional districts

References

External links 
Minnesota's 7th Congressional District Republicans

07